The Unghürhörner are a multi-summited mountain of the Silvretta Alps, located south-east of Klosters in the canton of Graubünden. They lie in the Vereina valley, west of the Plattenhörner.

The main summit has an elevation of 2,994 metres above sea level. A nearly equally high secondary summit has an elevation of 2,992 metres.

References

External links
 Unghürhörner on Hikr

Mountains of the Alps
Mountains of Graubünden
Mountains of Switzerland
Two-thousanders of Switzerland
Klosters-Serneus